Vista Unified School District is a public school district headquartered in Vista, California, United States. It serves sections of northern San Diego County.

The Vista Unified School District is the 4th largest school district in San Diego County and includes 32 schools with diverse educational programs for kindergarten through adult education students. VUSD has 17 elementary schools, three magnet schools, four middle schools, three comprehensive high schools, three alternative high schools, two special education schools and one adult school. VUSD serves more than 23,000 students and 2,000 adult education students in Vista, as well as sections of Oceanside, San Marcos, Carlsbad and some unincorporated areas of the County.

Schools

Middle and high schools
Guajome Park Academy

High schools
Alta Vista High School (AVHS)
Major General Raymond Murray High School (MGRMHS)
Mission Vista High School (MVHS)
Rancho Buena Vista High School (RBVHS)
Vista High School (Vista, California) (VHS)
Trade Tech High School (Charter)
Guajome Park Academy (Charter)

Middle schools

Madison Middle School (MMS)
Rancho Minerva Middle School (RMMS)
Roosevelt Middle School (RMS)
Vista Visions Academy (VVA)
Vista Magnet Middle School (VMMS)
Vista Innovation & Design Academy (VIDA)
Washington Middle School (defunct, successor is VIDA)
Guajome Park Academy (Charter)
Bella Mente Academy (Charter)

Elementary schools

Alamosa Park
Beaumont
Bella Mente Montessori Academy (Charter)
Bobier
Breeze Hill
California Ave
Casita Center 
Empresa
Foothill Oak
Grapevine
Guajome Park Academy (Charter)
Hannalei
Lake
Maryland
Mission Meadows
Monte Vista
North Star Academy
THE Leadership Academy (formerly Temple Heights) 
Vista Academy of Performing Arts (VAPA)

Budget crisis 
The district is not currently in a budget crisis. The budget is balanced for the next two school years.

Budget problems will surely exist throughout the state as businesses closed during the pandemic, reducing state tax revenue.  The state is also experiencing declining enrollment as a whole in public schools.

References

External links
Official website
https://www.sandiegouniontribune.com/opinion/editorials/story/2019-11-06/vista-unified-budget-13-million-cut
https://fox5sandiego.com/2019/10/18/vista-school-board-proposes-layoffs-program-cuts-balance-budget/
https://www.kpbs.org/news/2019/oct/18/vista-unified-superintendent-resigns-amidst-fiscal/

School districts in San Diego County, California
Vista, California
1936 establishments in California
School districts established in 1936